Wexford was a constituency represented in the Irish House of Commons until its abolition on 1 January 1801.

Members of Parliament 
 1376 James French
 1560 John Hassane and Richard Talbot
 1585 Patrick Furlong and Patrick Talbot
 1613–1615 John Turner and Robert Talbot
 1634–1635 Patrick Talbot and Richard Cheevers (Cheevers died and replaced by John Furlong)
 1639–1643 Patrick French (expelled) and John Talbot (expelled)(replaced 1646 by William Sacheverall) 
 1661–1666 Martin Noel and Thomas Hart

1689–1801

References

Constituencies of the Parliament of Ireland (pre-1801)
Historic constituencies in County Wexford
Wexford, County Wexford
1800 disestablishments in Ireland
Constituencies disestablished in 1800